ASLO or Aslo may refer to:
 Association for the Sciences of Limnology and Oceanography
 Anti-streptolysin O
 Australian Scientific Liaison Office
 Aslo, a character in the film Epic Movie